Snake Creek is a stream in the U.S. state of South Dakota. It is a tributary of South Fork Grand River.

Snake Creek was named on account of its irregular course.

See also
List of rivers of South Dakota

References

Rivers of Perkins County, South Dakota
Rivers of South Dakota